Saeid Azari (born March 21, 1968) is an Iranian retired weightlifter, coach and sport administrator. He is the current chairman of the Foolad FC.

References

1968 births
Living people
Iranian football chairmen and investors
Sportspeople from Isfahan
Zob Ahan Esfahan F.C.
Iranian male weightlifters
Iranian sports executives and administrators
20th-century Iranian people